Rosemary Harriet Millard  (born 17 April 1965) is a British journalist. writer and broadcaster.

Millard is Chair of BBC Children in Need and Chair of Firstsite gallery in Colchester. She is vice Chair of Opera North. Previous roles include CEO of Children and the Arts, Arts Editor of the New Statesman and Arts Correspondent of the BBC, which she did for ten years (1994-2004). She was Chair of Hull UK City of Culture 2017 and a former profile writer and columnist for the Sunday Times. She has been a theatre critic and property columnist and has also written regular comment columns for The Independent and i newspapers, and features, comment pieces and interviews for other national newspapers and magazines, including The Sunday Times,<ref>Rosie Millard, Rosie Millard and family: our gap travel adventure, The Sunday Times, 21 June 2009.</ref> The Times, The Independent, New Statesman. and ArtReview.

She wrote the Mr and Mrs Millard marital column in the Body and Soul section of the Saturday Times. She was the arts editor and theatre critic for New Statesman. Millard has written four books, The Tastemakers: U.K. Art Now.Rosie Millard, The Tastemakers: U.K. Art Now. Hardback: Thames & Hudson, 2001. . Paperback: Scribner, 2002. . She then wrote  Bonnes Vacances , a comic travel memoir recounting a journey around the French Overseas Territories with her children, published by Summersdale, 2011. This was published along a series of TV documentaries on the same trip presented by Millard.

Her first novel The Square is a comic romp set in London. It was published in August 2015 by Legend Press. Legend Press published the sequel The Brazilian in 2017.

In 2014 Millard was made Chair of Hull City of Culture 2017. That year 2017 brought millions of visitors into the city and created 800 jobs. She was appointed OBE in the 2018 New Year Honours List for services in the arts to the city of Hull.

Education
Millard was educated at Wimbledon High School, an independent school for girls in Wimbledon in southwest London. Millard is a graduate of Hull University, the London College of Communication and the Courtauld Institute. Millard was also educated at an American High School courtesy of the English-Speaking Union. Millard has been a Trustee of the Carnegie (UK) Foundation, Home Live Art and Modern Art Oxford. She has an Honorary Doctorate from the University of Hull.

Life and career
Millard started her career as a junior researcher on Granada TV's daytime show "This Morning", before later becoming the arts correspondent for the BBC between 1995 and 2004.

On 20 June 2014 BBC News announced that Millard was to be appointed the role of chairwoman of the company running Hull's UK City of Culture activities in 2017. Having arrived at the University of Hull more than 30 years ago to study for a degree in English and Drama, arts specialist Millard maintains close links with the city.

The first article Millard wrote for a national newspaper was about the Humber Bridge; she was live on ITV’s breakfast show to support Hull when the City of Culture 2017 announcement was made; and her article in celebration of Hull published in the Daily Telegraph'' on the same day highlighted the beauty of a city “on the edge of the earth” and on the cusp of cultural, social and economic change.

As a student reading English and Drama at the University of Hull in the mid-1980s, Millard worked on arts engagement projects in the city. She continues to be a passionate believer in the importance of accessibility to the arts for all.

Croissants in the Jungle, a 6-part documentary series for the Travel Channel, was made on Millard's journey around the French Overseas Territories with her family.

Millard has been Arts Editor and Theatre Critic at the New Statesman, a profile writer for The Sunday Times and a writer for the Telegraph.

Radio documentaries Millard has made for Radio 4 include the series The Move, plus documentaries In Defense of Pushy Parents, Stories from The Squeezed Middle, and Towering Ambition, which analysed why London has skyscrapers but Paris has none. Millard is a regular guest on Five Live talk shows and Jeremy Vine on Radio 2.

Millard does newspaper reviewing for news programmes on Sky or ITV, and occasionally appears on Newsnight or equivalent programmes to discuss topical issues, usually cultural or lifestyle. Millard appears frequently on television live debates. Millard co-produced a documentary in Perspectives for ITV1, Kick Out The Jams, which was presented by Gary Kemp and looked at the legacy of the Young British Artists.

On 18 January 2018, it was announced that Millard would become the chair of the BBC Children in Need. In February 2022 she became chair of the Philip Larkin Society.

Family life
Millard lives in Islington, north London with her partner Alex Graham. She and her ex-husband Pip Clothier have four children. Millard is a marathon runner; she has run ten marathons so far including the Great Wall of China Marathon and the six Abbott Marathon Majors. Her PB is 3.48. 
She has also been a Brownie leader and co-founded the Second South Islington Brownies.

References

External links 
 Rosie Millard website
 

1965 births
Living people
Alumni of the University of Hull
English journalists
English broadcasters
English columnists
English bloggers
English non-fiction writers
British theatre critics
BBC people
People educated at Wimbledon High School
The Sunday Times people
The Times people
British television journalists
People from Islington (district)
Officers of the Order of the British Empire